Danielle Baskin is an American conceptual artist based in San Francisco.

Baskin has created multiple businesses, often as the offshoots of performance art.  These include Branded Fruit, which sells fruit with printed corporate logos.

Dialup

Dialup is an app that connects strangers for phone calls on pre-determined topics.  It powers her related project QuarantineChat.

References

American conceptual artists
Living people

Year of birth missing (living people)